Smallville is a fictional town in American comic books published by DC Comics. The childhood hometown of Superman, Smallville was first named in Superboy #2 (May 1949). The town is the setting of many Superboy comics where Superboy defends Smallville from various threats.

History

The DC Comics universe has several different timelines, with a major reboot in the 1985 Crisis on Infinite Earths.

Pre-Crisis
In the earliest Golden Age comics, the name of Clark Kent's hometown is uncertain. Earliest stories would either show Clark's hometown as unnamed or even as Metropolis. However, as of Superboy #2, Smallville's name is permanently identified.

Smallville is retroactively shown as the Golden Age Superman's childhood hometown as well, as seen in the "Mr. and Mrs. Superman" series in Superman Family, as well as in The New Adventures of Superboy #15-16 (March–April 1981). Unlike Earth-One's Smallville, Earth-Two's Smallville stays a much less prominent small town since the Earth-Two Superman was never Superboy. Additionally, the Kents never owned a general store on Earth-Two, but instead stayed farmers until their deaths.

Post-Crisis
Smallville's history, as well as that of the Kents, is delved into in the late 1980s World of Smallville miniseries, plus the 1997-1998 miniseries The Kents.

Later, Smallville was retconned to have a violent history, with green kryptonite, a common substance in the area, having a mutating, dangerous effect on normal citizens of the town (similar to the TV show Smallville). This history, plus the near-destruction and reconstruction of the town by overzealous government forces, is explored in the storyline "The Search For Kryptonite."

Law and government
Smallville's chief of police is Chief Douglas Parker, who in pre-Crisis stories is considered a close ally of Superboy. Superboy is capable of being contacted by Chief Parker, as well as Lana Lang's father Professor Lewis Lang and the President of the United States, via a secret signal lamp hidden in the Kent household. Chief Parker exists in the post-Crisis DC comics, but his role is much less prominent.

In the modern comics, Smallville also has a sheriff department. It is headed by Sheriff Hayes who is murdered by a Black Lantern version of Earth-Two's Superman at the time when he was talking to his superiors about transferring to Metropolis.

A storyline late in the run of The New Adventures of Superboy sees Smallville's town council propose building Smallville's first shopping mall, though the mall's construction is revealed out to have sinister ulterior motives. While the storyline is unfinished as the comic was cancelled before the story could be concluded, it does see Jonathan Kent decide to run for a city council seat to try to thwart the mall's construction.

People
Noted residents of Smallville include the Kent family, Jonathan and Martha Kent, or Ma and Pa Kent as they were often called, and their adopted son Clark Kent; Clark's friend, classmate and sometimes romantic interest Lana Lang; Clark's best friend Pete Ross, and Smallville's chief of police Douglas Parker.

In the original Superboy comics, other noted residents include Professor Phineas Potter (Lana's uncle), archaeologist Lewis Lang (Lana's father), and the young Lex Luthor.

In post-Crisis comics, Conner Kent, an alternate Superboy, also lives in Smallville with the now-widowed Martha Kent. The super-powered dog Krypto lives with them as well. While not initially enjoying Smallville, Conner eventually changes his mind.

Features
Smallville is usually portrayed as an idyllic, small isolated American town, with a "Middle America" atmosphere – resembling the settings of some paintings of Norman Rockwell. Its residents are generally very friendly, though in Silver Age Superboy stories, it also tends to attract various threats (from criminals, alien invaders, etc.).

Smallville's economy mostly consists of various locally owned businesses, along with various farms surrounding the town, including the Kent family farm. In the original Superboy comics, the Kent family sells their farm when Clark starts school, and open a general store in town. Post-Crisis comics, however, show the Kents residing on their farm through Clark's adulthood.

Smallville has one high school, Smallville High School, which Clark, Lana, and Pete attend.

Smallville also was the home of the Smallville Orphanage, where the Kents originally brought the infant Kal-El after his rocket landed on Earth; the Kents returned several days later to formally adopt Kal-El, renaming him "Clark."

In terms of media, Smallville has had several newspapers mentioned over the years, including the Smallville Sentinel (shown in various stories in The New Adventures of Superboy) and the Smallville Times-Reader (in Elliot S. Maggin's "Last Son of Krypton" text novel). In Action Comics (vol. 2) #8, the Daily Star'''s editor George Taylor mentions to Clark Kent having met Ma and Pa Kent while working as a reporter for the Smallville Sentinel. Smallville receives most of its television and radio broadcasts from a larger nearby city, though Superboy #195 shows Smallville has its own radio station, WSMV.

In the original Superboy comics, a billboard outside of Smallville greets those driving into and out of town. The billboard features a picture of Superboy waving, with words next to it reading: "Welcome to Smallville, Home of Superboy."

Location

Similar to the whereabouts of other fictional DC Universe cities, the location of Smallville was, originally, never specifically stated in the comics.

Smallville's location varied widely throughout many stories, many of which placed Smallville close to Metropolis and Midvale, home of Supergirl. All-New Collectors' Edition #C-55 (notable for featuring the wedding of Legion of Super-Heroes members Lightning Lad and Saturn Girl and published in 1978) calls Smallville "a quiet town, nestled in the hills just inland from the eastern seaboard." Most sources since the 1986 John Byrne Superman origin reboot point the location of Smallville to be in Kansas.

Superman Family #195
In the Superboy story in Superman Family #195 (May–June 1979), Interstate 70 is shown as running through or near Smallville, as Lana and Clark drive along the highway. States the real-world Interstate 70 passes through include Utah, Colorado, Kansas (Smallville's usual post-Crisis location), Missouri, Illinois, Indiana, Ohio, West Virginia, Pennsylvania, and Maryland (cited in some pre-Crisis references as Smallville's location).

Amazing World of DC Comics #14
In Amazing World of DC Comics #14 (1977), an officially sanctioned fanzine with articles on DC Comics characters and series, Smallville was stated to be in Maryland. The Maryland location was supported in the comics with a map of Smallville and the surrounding area that was published in New Adventures of Superboy #22 (October 1981), which situated Smallville a few miles west of a large bay very similar to Delaware Bay (the same map placed Metropolis and Gotham City on the east and west sides of the bay.

Legion of Super-Heroes volume 2 #313
A map of Legion-era Metropolis included in Legion of Super-Heroes (vol. 2) #313 (July 1984) indicates that Smallville was believed by the 1980s to be somewhere in northeastern Pennsylvania or northern New Jersey, while incorporated into Metropolis proper at that time as a historical district. In revisions of the map published after 1986, this was retroactively removed to accommodate changes of Smallville's location in other titles, as detailed below.

The Death and Life of Superman (novel)
In the novel The Death and Life of Superman (1993), Jonathan and Martha Kent drive to Smallville from the Great Bend, Kansas, airport which would put Smallville somewhere in central Kansas.

The Kents
The 1990s limited series The Kents places Smallville in eastern Kansas, within approximately one day's horse ride from Paola, Kansas, which is located in Miami County.

Action Comics #822
In "Repo Man" Pt. 1, Smallville is placed approximately 55 miles from Salina, Kansas, and in line with Junction City, giving it approximately the same location as Dorrance, Kansas.

Smallville Season 11Smallville Season 11 is the comic book sequel to the Smallville television series. This version of Smallville has a zip code of 67524, which is the real world zip code for Chase, Kansas. Although this Smallville is described as being about two hundred miles west of Wichita and southwest of Dodge City, placing it around Liberal, Kansas, while Chase is 73 miles Northwest of Wichita.

In other media
Television

 The Superboy TV series also places Smallville in Kansas, stating it is where Clark and Lana grew up. The main action of that series takes place at the fictional Shuster University in Florida, named for Superman/Superboy's co-creator, artist, Joe Shuster.

 Lois & Clark: The New Adventures of Superman places Smallville as a city in Kansas as well, though Metropolis is located on the east coast (or maybe in eastern Pennsylvania, it is never stated for sure) and Superman must fly between the two locations using his super-speed.

 Smallville was featured in Superman: The Animated Series. It was also in Kansas.

 In the television series Smallville, the town's location is two hundred miles west of Wichita and southwest of Dodge City, implied by the series to be located in west Kansas. The skyline of Metropolis is visible from high points of Smallville on a clear day. Though some episodes reference an hours-long drive from Smallville to Metropolis, characters easily—and frequently—traverse between the two towns. The headquarters of LuthorCorp are in Metropolis, and a LutherCorp plant is located in Smallville. Smallville is famous for a meteor shower that hit the town in 1989, and for the lingering effects of the meteor rocks on the town and some of its citizens. The meteor shower was a cover for the spaceship that brought Clark Kent to Kansas. It was later revealed that the meteor shower also brought Davis Bloome, also known as Doomsday, to Earth as well. The second-season episode "Lineage" gives its zip code as 67524, which is the real life code for Chase, Kansas.

 Smallville appears in the Young Justice: Invasion episode "True Colors." Robin, Blue Beetle, Arsenal and Impulse go undercover in LexCorp Farms as tourists, and split off from the tour group halfway through the tour. They manage to procure a sample of the Reach's additive, but on their way out, are confronted by Black Beetle. After Green Beetle joins the fight as well, the heroes regroup. At Jonathan Kent's farm, Alpha Squad and Green Beetle meet up with Nightwing and Superboy. Lex Luthor and Vandal Savage discuss the damage done to the farms and conclude that the main production lines were never in any harm.

 Smallville appears in The CW shows set in the Arrowverse:
 Smallville first appears in the crossover event "Elseworlds". In "Elseworlds," a power-swapped Flash and Green Arrow arrive on Earth-38 to enlist the help of Supergirl who is visiting Superman and Lois Lane at the Kent family farm following the arrests of Manchester Black and Agent Liberty. Supergirl and Superman help Flash and Green Arrow work on their swapped powers using the Kent family farm as their location.
 Smallville appears in the crossover "Crisis on Infinite Earths". Superman, Lois Lane, and Iris West briefly visit Earth-167 (the setting of Smallville) where it was suspected that this Clark Kent is the Paragon of Hope. They are teleported away by their Lex Luthor who discovered that this world's Clark Kent gave up his powers.
 Smallville appears in Superman & Lois. The episode "Pilot" establishes it in Rice County, KS.

Film
 Smallville was first placed in Kansas by the 1978 film Superman: The Movie, although filming of the Kent family's agricultural land was done in Blackie, Alberta, Canada. The tag on the truck driven by Jonathan Kent (Glenn Ford) in the first film had a Cloud County, Kansas identifier. Areas of Calgary were presented as Smallville in Superman III while the surrounding fields of the town of Baldock, England portrayed the abandoned Kent farm in Superman IV: The Quest for Peace.
 Smallville appears in Superman: Doomsday.
 Smallville appears in Superman/Batman: Apocalypse.
 Smallville appears in Superman vs The Elite.
 Smallville appears in the films set in the DC Extended Universe: 
 Plano, Illinois was used in Man of Steel,  a spaceship was found by local farmer Jonathan Kent and his wife Martha. They discovered a baby in the ship and raised him as their own, naming him Clark Kent. Clark grew up in the town and his powers first manifested there. Eventually his parents revealed his alien origins after Clark used his powers to save his classmates on a flooding bus after it drove off a bridge. In 2013, General Zod and his Kryptonian forces entered Smallville in search of the growth codex. They confronted Martha Kent at her home before her son Clark Kent arrived to stop them, now wearing a blue alien superhero suit with a cape. No longer worried about hiding his powers, Clark fought Zod, and later Faora-Ul and Nam-Ek throughout Smallville destroying portions of it as a result. With the aid of the US military, Clark defeated the Kryptonians. 
 Yorkville, Illinois was used in Batman v Superman: Dawn of Justice,  Clark Kent's funeral was held on the Kent farm in Smallville. At the funeral, Martha gave Lois an envelope with an engagement ring which was to be given to her during Clark's proposal. Heartbroken, she wears the engagement ring as she drops a pile of dirt on Clark's casket.
 In Justice League, Flash and Cyborg were sent to retrieve Clark's body from Smallville. After Clark is brought back to life, he and Lois return to the Kent farm, where Clark fully regains his memories and reunites with Martha Kent.

Video games
 Smallville appears in DC Universe Online. In the game, Lex Luthor has done an experiment where he has experimented on its citizens using Exobytes and Doomsday's DNA with Doomsday being trapped in a containment entropy cage in the barn near the Kent Family Farm. Jonathan Kent, Lana Lang, and Pete Ross are among the Smallville citizens that have been transformed into Doomsday-like creatures. Due to the experiments, Smallville has been practically destroyed.
 Smallville appears in Lego DC Super-Villains. In the game's story, Gorilla Grodd, Killer Frost, Scarecrow, and the Rookie travel here in search for something to get them to space. Outside of the story, the player can freely explore the town and its surrounding areas.

Radio
The first time in any media that Smallville or the Kent farm were linked to a specific location was in The Adventures of Superman radio show. In the storyline "The Secret Rocket" (9/29/47-10/30/47), mention was made several times that young Clark Kent grew up on Eben Kent's farm in Iowa. The farmtown was unnamed in the story (as the name "Smallville" appeared for the first time two years later in Superboy (volume 1) #2); the nearest town named in the broadcast was the real-life Centerville.

Novels
 Superman writer Elliot S. Maggin incorporated the Kansas location into the DC Universe in his 1981 Superman novel, Miracle Monday. In the novel, It's Superman! by Tom De Haven, which is set in 1938, Smallville is placed in Osage County along U.S. Highway 75.

Other uses
Smallville is also a nickname given to Clark Kent by Lois Lane. Adaptations of the Superman mythos that feature Lois using this nickname include the television series Lois & Clark: The New Adventures of Superman, Superman: The Animated Series, and Smallville''.

On June 21, 2013, Hutchinson, Kansas officially changed its name to Smallville for a day, thanks to a campaign started by local residents Ben Eisiminger, KC Mcneely, and Christopher Wietrick. The annual "Smallville Comic Con" has been hosted at the Kansas State Fairgrounds since 2017.

References

External links
 Supermanica wiki's entry on Smallville
 Smallville Wiki

1949 in comics
Fictional elements introduced in 1949
Publisher
DC Comics titles
Fictional populated places in Kansas
DC Comics populated places

ca:Smallville
pl:Tajemnice Smallville
sq:Smallville
sv:Smallville